The 1977-78 Penn State Nittany Lions men's basketball team represented the Pennsylvania State University during the 1977-78 NCAA Division I men's basketball season. The team was led by 10th-year head coach Johnny Bach, and played their home games at Rec Hall in University Park, Pennsylvania as members of the Eastern Athletic Association (Eastern 8).

Roster

Schedule

|-
!colspan=12 style=|EAAC tournament

Source

References

Penn State Nittany Lions basketball seasons
1977 in sports in Pennsylvania
1978 in sports in Pennsylvania